"Think" is a song written by American singer Aretha Franklin and Ted White, and first recorded by Franklin. It was released as a single in 1968, from her Aretha Now album. The song reached No. 7 on the Billboard Hot 100, becoming Franklin's seventh top 10 hit in the United States. The song also reached number 1 on the magazine's Hot Rhythm & Blues Singles, becoming her sixth single to top the chart. The song was written by Franklin and her then husband Ted White. Franklin re-recorded the song in the Atlantic Records New York studio for the soundtrack of the 1980 film The Blues Brothers and in 1989 for the album Through the Storm. Pitchfork placed it at number 15 on its list of "The 200 Greatest Songs of the 1960s".

Billboard described the single as a "pulsating swinger with another wild performance" that had a similar feel to "Respect" and which it expected would quickly reach a million sales. Cash Box said it has "wailing lyrics of a hard-luck love affair" and "tremendous rhythmic drive."

Chart performance

Sales and certifications

Personnel
Credits are adapted from the liner notes of Aretha Now.

Musicians
Aretha Franklin – lead vocals, piano
Willie Bridges, Floyd Newman – baritone saxophone
Charles Chalmers, Andrew Love – tenor saxophone
Tommy Cogbill, Jimmy Johnson – guitar
Roger Hawkins – drums
Wayne Jackson – trumpet
Jerry Jemmott – bass guitar
Spooner Oldham – Hammond organ
The Sweet Inspirations – background vocals

Production 
Jerry Wexler – producer
Tom Dowd, Arif Mardin – arrangements
Tom Dowd – engineer

Versions
Franklin performed a new version of the song in a musical sequence of the The Blues Brothers (1980). Because Franklin was not used to lip-syncing, this scene required a number of takes and considerable editing. A 3:15 version of the song appears on the film's soundtrack album. In addition to Franklin, the recording features the Blues Brothers band and backup vocals from Franklin's sister Carolyn and cousin Brenda Corbett.

Franklin recorded an updated 3:38 version titled "Think (1989)" for her 1989 album Through the Storm. It was produced and arranged by Arif Mardin with his son Joe Mardin. She re-recorded the song for Mothers Against Drunk Driving as a public service announcement during the late 1980s.

Cover versions
Katharine McPhee's version of the song was released as a limited single from the American Idol 5: Encores (2006) album. The song became a minor Internet hit for McPhee—it was her first song to chart in the Pop 100, where it peaked at No. 90 due to download sales.

See also
List of number-one R&B singles of 1968 (U.S.)

References

External links
Song Review at AllMusic

1968 singles
1968 songs
2006 singles
Aretha Franklin songs
Atlantic Records singles
Katharine McPhee songs
Songs with feminist themes
Song recordings produced by Jerry Wexler
Songs written by Aretha Franklin